The Français Rocks are a group of fringing rocks lying off the northeast coast of D'Urville Island, in the Joinville Island group. The name "Pointe des Français" (point of the French) was given by Captain Jules Dumont d'Urville, of the French Antarctic Expedition, 1837–40, to the northeast point of the island which at that time was believed to be continuous with Joinville Island. Surveys by the Falkland Islands Dependencies Survey (1952–54) and aerial photographs by the Falkland Islands and Dependencies Aerial Survey Expedition (1956–57) have not revealed a definable point hereabout. For the sake of historical continuity in the area, the UK Antarctic Place-Names Committee (1978) applied the name Français Rocks to these fringing rocks.

References

Rock formations of the Joinville Island group